Off the Mark, also known as Crazy Legs, is a 1987 American comedy film directed by Bill Berry and starring Mark Neely, Terry Farrell, Clarence Gilyard Jr., Norman Alden and Virginia Capers. The musical score was composed by David Michael Frank.

Cast
 Mark Neely
 Terry Farrell
 Clarence Gilyard Jr.
 Norman Alden
 Virginia Capers
 Jon Cypher
 Barry Corbin
 Alexander Polinsky
 Susan Luck
 Darius Lawrence
 Melanie Lasher
 Kelly Meadows
 Matthew Licht
 Patrick Campbell

References

External links
 
 

1987 films
1987 comedy films
American comedy films
Films scored by David Michael Frank
1980s English-language films
1980s American films